Driopea griseobasalis is a species of Longhorn beetle. The scientific name was first published in 1968 by Breuning.

References

Driopea
Beetles described in 1968